Kuhle Sonkosi (born 23 August 1992 in East London) is a South African rugby union player, who most recently played with the . His regular position is lock.

Career

Youth

Sonkosi first represented Eastern Province at the 2010 Under-18 Academy Week tournament. He played for the  side in the 2011 Under-19 Provincial Championship competition and for the  side in the 2012 and 2013 competitions, winning the Under-21 Division B title on both occasions.

Eastern Province Kings

He scored his first try in senior rugby in his second match two weeks later, against  in Cape Town.

He did not feature in the Eastern Province Kings' return to the Premier Division of the Currie Cup in 2014, but was named in a Kings training squad for the 2015 season.

References

1992 births
Living people
Eastern Province Elephants players
Rugby union players from East London, Eastern Cape
South African rugby union players
Rugby union locks